Blue Mountain State is an American comedy series that premiered on Spike on January 11, 2010. All  three of the seasons of the show were aired on Spike TV. The series follows the players on the football team of the fictional university, Blue Mountain State, and its rather awkward team "The Goats" as they explore the freedoms of college life, including football, scoring with women, drinking binges, wild partying, and hazing. The series was created by Chris Romano, who also stars in the series, and Eric Falconer.

As of November 30, 2011, a total of 39 episodes have been shown. The series was renewed for a second season in February 2010. A sneak peek of the second episode of season two aired on October 16; the season premiere was on October 20, 2010. Blue Mountain State was renewed for a third season and it premiered on September 21, 2011 with back-to-back episodes.

Series overview

Episodes

Season 1 (2010)

Season 2 (2010–11)
Blue Mountain State averaged 949,000 viewers through the first six episodes of season one while improving on the time slot by 165% among men 18–24. In February 2010 it was renewed for a second season.

Season 3 (2011)
Aired on Spike

References

External links 
 
 List of 

Lists of American sitcom episodes